Rhetenor texanus is a species of jumping spider. It has been found in Texas and Veracruz, Mexico.

References

External links

 

Salticidae
Articles created by Qbugbot
Spiders described in 1936